The battle on the Zerabulak heights is the decisive battle of the Russian army under the command of General Kaufman with the army of the Bukhara emir Muzaffar, which took place in June 1868, on the slopes of the Zera-tau mountain range, between Samarkand and Bukhara. It ended with the defeat of the Bukhara army, and the transition of the Bukhara Emirate to vassal dependence on the Russian Empire.

Battle 
After the capture of Samarkand in May 1868 by General Kaufman, in order to finally defeat the Bukharians, a campaign was undertaken in the direction of Bukhara.

In the meantime, it became known that a large Bukhara army was gathering at the Zerabulak heights, located about half the way from Samarkand to Bukhara. According to intelligence, there were about 30,000 people in it. Having received such news, General Kaufman, leaving a small garrison in Samarkand, decided to advance with the main forces to meet the enemy.

On the night of June 14, 1868, the Russian detachment approached the Zerabulak heights. At their foot stood the Bukhara infantry, behind it, on a hill - 14 guns and a mass of cavalry. The battle began at 4 am. Colonel Alexander Pistolkors, who commanded the vanguard, led his soldiers to attack the enemy's left flank. At the same time, the Cossacks moved, and the artillery began firing buckshot at the enemy infantry. The people of Bukhara, not expecting such pressure, wavered and ran. The Cossacks rushed in pursuit, but the Bukhara infantry, as soon as it emerged from the grapple fire, again lined up and began to retreat in an orderly manner, firing back and defending itself according to all the rules. Nevertheless, the entire hollow along which they retreated was covered with the bodies of Bukhara soldiers.

On the right flank, a battalion of 280 Russian infantrymen who had gone into hand-to-hand combat was unexpectedly surrounded by the Bukharians: enemy infantry was pressing in front, cavalry came in from the rear. There was no way to help them, but, suddenly rushing into a bayonet attack, Russian soldiers overturned the enemy and got rid of the encirclement themselves, losing only 17 people wounded.

The entire Bukhara army gradually began to retreat, at first in order, and then - throwing weapons and ammunition. By 10 o'clock in the morning everything was over, the heights were cleared of the enemy. Among the trophies of General Kaufman's detachment was an artillery gun and 40 pack boxes with shells.

References

Works cited

General references
 Zaravshan campaign of 1868 // Military encyclopedia: [in 18 volumes] / ed. VF Novitsky ... [and others]. - SPb. ; [M.]: Type. t-va I. D. Sytin, 1911-1915.
 Lyko M.V. Essay on military operations in 1868 in the Zaravshan valley. - SPb .: type. Department of Udelov, 1871.
 A.S. Morrison. Russian Rule in Samarkand 1868-1910: A Comparison with British India

Emirate of Bukhara
Conflicts in 1868
19th-century military history of the Russian Empire
Central Asia in the Russian Empire